Gary K. Wolfe (born Gary Kent Wolfe in 1946) is an American science fiction editor, critic and biographer. He is an emeritus Professor of Humanities in Roosevelt University's Evelyn T. Stone College of Professional Studies.

Life 

Wolfe was born on March 24, 1946, in Sedalia, Missouri. He moved to Carrollton, Missouri, at age 12, and to Springfield, at 14, where he finished high school. He began attending Southwest Missouri State College (now University), transferred to University of Kansas, where he earned a B.A. in English in 1968, and worked for his honors thesis under Professor James Gunn.

From there, he transferred to University of Chicago, where Wolfe earned a Ph.D. in English, in 1971.

He was married to Ellen "Dede" Weil, a teacher and community service activist, in 1996. They held another wedding celebration at the International Conference on the Fantastic in the Arts (ICFA) in a pool-side party, attended by many of their friends and colleagues, in March, 1997. Wolfe and Weil were happily married until her death in 2000. Before her death they collaborated on a book about Harlan Ellison, and often attended the International Conference on the Fantastic in the Arts, in Florida.

Writing career 

Wolfe has written extensively about science fiction and fantasy literature; he is recognized as one of the experts in the field.

He has had a monthly review column in Locus since December, 1991 and has written for Salon and other sites.  He collaborates with editor Jonathan Strahan on The Coode Street Podcast, a "discussion and digression on science fiction and fantasy" that was launched in May 2010, and is syndicated at Tor.com.

In 2016, he taught the course How Great Science Fiction Works for The Great Courses.

Honors 

1979 – Eaton Award from the Eaton Conference on Science Fiction for The Known and the Unknown: the Iconography of Science Fiction

1987 – Pilgrim Award for Lifetime Achievement from the Science Fiction Research Association

1998 – Distinguished Scholarship Award from the International Association for the Fantastic in the Arts.  

2005 – British Science Fiction Association Award for nonfiction for Soundings: Reviews 1992–1996

He was nominated for the Hugo Award for Best Related Work in 2006 for the book Soundings, Reviews 1992–1996, and again in 2011, for the book Bearings: Reviews 1997–2001.  In addition, along with Jonathan Strahan, The Coode Street Podcast has been nominated for the Hugo Award for Best Fancast six times.

Bibliography

Books

 David Lindsay (Starmont House, 1979) – A study of the Scottish author who is remembered for his 1920 novel A Voyage to Arcturus.
 Critical Terms for Science Fiction and Fantasy: A Glossary and Guide to Scholarship (Greenwood Press, 1986) – described as a "landmark" work and "an indispensable guide to the sometimes peculiar terminology that has developed both in critical discourse and in popular discussions of fantasy and science fiction" by scholar David Sandner.
 Harlan Ellison: The Edge of Forever (with Ellen R. Weil, Ohio State University Press, 2002).
 Soundings: Reviews 1992–1996 (Beccon Publications, 2005).
 Bearings: Reviews 1997–2001 (Beccon Publications, 2010).
 Evaporating Genres: Essays on Fantastic Literature and Sightings (2010) Wesleyan University Press, 978-0-8195-6937-0).
 Sightings: Reviews 2002–2006 (Beccon Publications, 2011).
 American Science Fiction: Four Classic Novels 1953-1956 (2012) Library of America – The Space Merchants, Frederik Pohl and C. M. Kornbluth, More Than Human, Theodore Sturgeon, The Long Tomorrow, Leigh Brackett, The Shrinking Man, Richard Matheson.
 American Science Fiction: Five Classic Novels 1956-1958 (2012) Library of America – Double Star, Robert A. Heinlein, The Stars My Destination by Alfred Bester, A Case of Conscience by James Blish, Who? by Algis Budrys, The Big Time by Fritz Leiber.

Book reviews

References

Further reading

External links 

 

Wolfe, Gary K. entry in The Encyclopedia of Science Fiction

1946 births
Living people
American speculative fiction critics
American speculative fiction editors
Science fiction academics
Science fiction critics
World Fantasy Award-winning writers
20th-century American non-fiction writers
21st-century American non-fiction writers
Male speculative fiction editors